Losin' Lately Gambler is the sixth studio album by Corb Lund and the Hurtin' Albertans. It was released in Canada on New West Records on September 22, 2009. It is also Lund's first album to be released in the United States.

Track listing

Chart performance

References

2009 albums
Corb Lund and the Hurtin' Albertans albums
New West Records albums